The Aran Volcanic Group is a geologic group in Wales. It preserves fossils dating back to the Ordovician period.

See also

 List of fossiliferous stratigraphic units in Wales

References
 
 https://data.bgs.ac.uk/id/Lexicon/NamedRockUnit/AVG.html

Geologic formations of Wales
Ordovician System of Europe
Ordovician Wales